The Good Shepherd is a 1955 nautical and war novel by C. S. Forester. It illustrates the difficulties of the Battle of the Atlantic: the struggle against the sea, the enemy, and the exhaustion brought on by constant vigilance. It also details the problems of the early radar and ASDIC equipment available and the poor communications between the fleet and Admiralty using HF Radio and early manual cryptography. A film adaptation, Greyhound, was released in 2020 starring Tom Hanks.

Plot
The hero of The Good Shepherd is Commander George Krause, the captain of the fictional US Navy Mahan-class destroyer USS Keeling in World War II. Krause is in overall command of an escort force protecting an Atlantic convoy in the Battle of the Atlantic, shepherding it through the Mid-Atlantic gap where no antisubmarine aircraft are able to defend convoys. He finds himself in a difficult position. The voyage in question occurs early in 1942, shortly after the United States's entry into the war. Although he is a career Navy officer, with many years of seniority, this is Krause's first wartime mission.  The captains of the other vessels in the escort group are junior to him in rank, and much younger, but they have been at war for over two years.

The story covers 13 watches (52 hours) aboard the ship's bridge and is told in third person entirely from Krause's point of view as he fights to save his ship, detailing his mood swings from his intense and focused excitement and awareness during combat to his resulting fatigue, depression, and self-doubt as his self-perceived inferiority and inexperience relative to the other captains under his command trouble him—although as the story progresses he is shown to be quite capable. He broods over his career and the wife who left him, partly because of his strict devotion to duty. He is troubled when the press of duty forces him to neglect his prayers (unlike most of Forester's other heroes, Krause is devout). He is troubled by recollections that the Navy review board had twice passed him over for promotion, returning a judgment of fitted and retained because there was little or no opportunity in the prewar Navy. His promotion to commander only came when the United States entered the war, leading him to fear that he may be unsuited to his command.

The book also focuses on the intense combat between the Keeling and multiple U-boats, with the Keeling eventually racking up multiple kills, and on the ship's daring rescue missions as the convoy increasingly falls prey to the U-boats, all in a race against time to escape the undefended stretches of the Atlantic. The book is a rich, detailed accounting of naval warfare, ship handling, and the inner logic of an experienced officer wrestling with the many minute judgments necessary to maintain rigid discipline during conditions of relentless tedium punctuated with extreme danger.

Audiobook 
The book has been turned into an audiobook narrated by Edoardo Ballerini and produced by Podium Audio. The audiobook was released in May 2020.

Film adaptation

The story was adapted into the feature film Greyhound, written and produced  by and starring Tom Hanks, also featuring Stephen Graham, directed by Aaron Schneider, and produced by Gary Goetzman. Principal photography began in spring 2018 aboard the museum ship , a decommissioned destroyer. The film was released in July 2020.

References

External links
 

1955 British novels
British novels adapted into films
Novels by C. S. Forester
Novels set during World War II
Michael Joseph books